The second Minnesota Territorial Legislature first convened on January 1, 1851. The 9 members of the Minnesota Territorial Council were elected during the General Election of August 1, 1849, and the 18 members of the Minnesota House of Representatives were elected during the General Election of September 2, 1850.

Sessions 
The territorial legislature met in a regular session from January 1, 1851 to March 31, 1851. There were no special sessions of the second territorial legislature.

Party summary 
Resignations and new members are discussed in the "Membership changes" section, below.

Council

House of Representatives

Leadership 
President of the Council
David B. Loomis (W-Marine)

Speaker of the House
Michael E. Ames (D-Stillwater)

Members

Council

House of Representatives

Membership changes

House of Representatives

Notes

References 

 Minnesota Legislators Past & Present - Session Search Results (Session 0.2, Senate)
 Minnesota Legislators Past & Present - Session Search Results (Session 0.2, House)

00.2nd
1850s in Minnesota Territory